Lycoperdon pulcherrimum is a type of puffball mushroom in the genus Lycoperdon. It was first described scientifically in 1873 by Miles Joseph Berkeley and Moses Ashley Curtis. The fungus is found in the southern United States.

References

External links

Puffballs
Fungi described in 1873
Fungi of the United States
Taxa named by Miles Joseph Berkeley
pulcherrimum
Fungi without expected TNC conservation status